Łukasz Kowalski (born 1 December 1980 in Łaszczów) is a Polish football manager and former player who played as defender.

References 
 

1980 births
Living people
People from Tomaszów Lubelski County
Sportspeople from Lublin Voivodeship
Association football defenders
Polish footballers
Arka Gdynia players
Bałtyk Gdynia players
Gedania 1922 Gdańsk players
Hetman Zamość players
Bytovia Bytów players
Bruk-Bet Termalica Nieciecza players
Ekstraklasa players
I liga players
II liga players
III liga players
Polish football managers
Olimpia Elbląg managers
II liga managers